These hits topped the Ultratop 50 in the Flanders region of Belgium in 1991.

See also
1991 in music

References

1991 in Belgium
1991 record charts
1991